The Plymouth GTX is an automobile introduced as the Belvedere GTX in 1967 by the Plymouth division. It was positioned as a mid-sized upscale-trimmed performance muscle car through the 1971 model year. 



1967

The GTX was based on the Belvedere, and was differentiated by a blacked out grille and special rear fascia, fiberglass simulated hood scoops with optional racing stripes, a chrome "pop-open" fuel filler cap, and a tachometer mounted on the center console.

The GTX was positioned as a "gentleman's muscle car". Optional was Chrysler's  Hemi. A heavy duty suspension system was also standard.

Performance

1968-1970

1968

Chrysler introduced major changes in the design of the 1968 model Plymouth B-bodies and the GTX was given a completely new look. A new hourglass body replaced the previous rectilinear design. The high performance 440 was standard in the GTX as was the TorqueFlite automatic transmission, while it was an extra cost option in the Road Runner. The GTX used the Sport Satellite trim and was offered in two body styles, a two-door convertible and a two-door hardtop (no B-pillar). All featured dual horizontal "racing stripes" on the lower sides ending with a GTX emblem ahead of the rear wheel openings. 

The GTX was positioned to be an upscale model of the Plymouth Road Runner by adding luxury to performance. The new budget performance version of the Belvedere featured the new  "Super Commando" V8 (renamed the "Road Runner 383"). It also had less insulation and comfort items, which reduced weight and kept it in the low price field.

1969

In 1969, the GTX's sales dropped when the Road Runner was also offered in a convertible body style. The GTX received minor cosmetic changes to the tail lights and grille, as well as the side marker lights. An optional "Air Grabber" hood (standard on Hemi-engined cars) featured functional openings on both sides of the hood that were controlled from the dash.

The 1969 GTX had standard black lower-body side paint in place of the previous stripes. This was the last year that the convertible model was available on the GTX. Total production was 701 GTX convertibles in 1969. Of those, eleven were equipped with the 426 Hemi; four were 4-speeds and seven had TorqueFlite automatics.

1970

The 1970 GTX received a minor redesign with a new grille and rear taillights. Sales were low as the car did not look much different from the Road Runner. Stylists made the lines smoother, and a "power bulge" hood was introduced, as well as non-functional rear-brake air scoops. The convertible body style was no longer available. The Air Grabber hood returned, but instead of having two narrow openings running length-wise as in 1969, it had one opening scoop located on the power bulge. The GTX was available with the standard 440 four-barrel carburetor. Optional were the 440+6 barrel (three 2-barrel carburetors) and the 426 Hemi. In keeping with the GTX marketing strategy, the 1970 model included many standard features. 

The only other performance luxury model in Plymouth's lineup was the full-size Sport Fury GT, built on the C-Body platform. The GT was added to the lineup in 1970.

1971

The B-body was redesigned for 1971 and featured rounded "fuselage" styling with a raked windshield, hidden cowl, and a loop-type front bumper around a deeply inset grille and headlights. This was the final year for the GTX as a stand-alone model. The convertible body style was dropped. 

Engine choices were 440 four-barrel, 440 with three two-barrels (Six Pack), and 426 Hemi. Due partly to rising insurance rates on muscle cars, sales were low. There were fewer than 3,000 units produced in 1971 (a total of 2,942), and only 30 cars were equipped with the Hemi engine, which was discontinued after this year.

For 1972 through 1974, any Road Runner ordered with the optional 440 was renamed Road Runner GTX and included the badging of both previous models.

Notes

External links

Plymouth GTX
Plymouth GTX Resources

GTX
Muscle cars
Rear-wheel-drive vehicles
Convertibles
Coupés
Cars introduced in 1967
1970s cars